In chemistry, octahedral molecular geometry, also called square bipyramidal, describes the shape of compounds with six atoms or groups of atoms or ligands symmetrically arranged around a central atom, defining the vertices of an octahedron. The octahedron has eight faces, hence the prefix octa. The octahedron is one of the Platonic solids, although octahedral molecules typically have an atom in their centre and no bonds between the ligand atoms. A perfect octahedron belongs to the point group Oh. Examples of octahedral compounds are sulfur hexafluoride SF6 and molybdenum hexacarbonyl Mo(CO)6. The term "octahedral" is used somewhat loosely by chemists, focusing on the geometry of the bonds to the central atom and not considering differences among the ligands themselves. For example, which is not octahedral in the mathematical sense due to the orientation of the  bonds, is referred to as octahedral.

The concept of octahedral coordination geometry was developed by Alfred Werner to explain the stoichiometries and isomerism in coordination compounds. His insight allowed chemists to rationalize the number of isomers of coordination compounds. Octahedral transition-metal complexes containing amines and simple anions are often referred to as Werner-type complexes.

Isomerism in octahedral complexes 

When two or more types of ligands (La, Lb, ...) are coordinated to an octahedral metal centre (M), the complex can exist as isomers. The naming system for these isomers depends upon the number and arrangement of different ligands.

cis and trans 
For MLL, two isomers exist. These isomers of MLL are cis, if the Lb ligands are mutually adjacent, and trans, if the Lb groups are situated 180° to each other. It was the analysis of such complexes that led Alfred Werner to the 1913 Nobel Prize–winning postulation of octahedral complexes.

Facial and meridional isomers 
For MLL, two isomers are possible - a facial isomer (fac) in which each set of three identical ligands occupies one face of the octahedron surrounding the metal atom, so that any two of these three ligands are mutually cis, and a meridional isomer (mer) in which each set of three identical ligands occupies a plane passing through the metal atom.

Δ vs Λ isomers
Complexes with three bidentate ligands or two cis bidentate ligands can exist as enantiomeric pairs.  Examples are shown below.

Other 
For MLLL, a total of five geometric isomers and six stereoisomers are possible. 
 One isomer in which all three pairs of identical ligands are trans
 Three isomers in which one pair of identical ligands (La or Lb or Lc) is trans while the other two pairs of ligands are mutually cis. 
 Two enantiomeric pair in which all three pairs of identical ligands are cis. These are equivalent to the Δ vs Λ isomers mentioned above.

The number of possible isomers can reach 30 for an octahedral complex with six different ligands (in contrast, only two stereoisomers are possible for a tetrahedral complex with four different ligands). The following table lists all possible combinations for monodentate ligands:

Thus, all 15 diastereomers of MLaLbLcLdLeLf are chiral, whereas for MLLbLcLdLe, six diastereomers are chiral and three are not (the ones where La are trans). One can see that octahedral coordination allows much greater complexity than the tetrahedron that dominates organic chemistry. The tetrahedron MLaLbLcLd exists as a single enantiomeric pair. To generate two diastereomers in an organic compound, at least two carbon centers are required.

Deviations from ideal symmetry

Jahn–Teller effect 

The term can also refer to octahedral influenced by the Jahn–Teller effect, which is a common phenomenon encountered in coordination chemistry. This reduces the symmetry of the molecule from Oh to D4h and is known as a tetragonal distortion.

Distorted octahedral geometry 
The specific geometry is known as a monocapped octahedron, since it is derived from the octahedron by placing the lone pair over the centre of one triangular face of the octahedron as a "cap" (and shifting the positions of the other six atoms to accommodate it). These both represent a divergence from the geometry predicted by VSEPR, which for AX6E1 predicts a pentagonal pyramidal shape.

Bioctahedral structures
Pairs of octahedra can be fused in a way that preserves the octahedral coordination geometry by replacing terminal ligands with bridging ligands.  Two motifs for fusing octahedra are common: edge-sharing and face-sharing.  Edge- and face-shared bioctahedra have the formulas [M2L8(μ-L)]2 and M2L6(μ-L)3, respectively. Polymeric versions of the same linking pattern give the stoichiometries [ML2(μ-L)2]∞ and [M(μ-L)3]∞, respectively.

The sharing of an edge or a face of an octahedron gives a structure called bioctahedral. Many metal pentahalide and pentaalkoxide compounds exist in solution and the solid with bioctahedral structures. One example is niobium pentachloride. Metal tetrahalides often exist as polymers with edge-sharing octahedra. Zirconium tetrachloride is an example.  Compounds with face-sharing octahedral chains include MoBr3, RuBr3, and TlBr3.

Trigonal prismatic geometry 

For compounds with the formula MX6, the chief alternative to octahedral geometry is a trigonal prismatic geometry, which has symmetry D3h. In this geometry, the six ligands are also equivalent. The interconversion of Δ- and Λ-complexes, which is usually slow, is proposed to proceed via a trigonal prismatic intermediate, a process called the "Bailar twist". An alternative pathway for the racemization of these same complexes is the Ray–Dutt twist.

Splitting of d-orbital energies 

For a free ion, e.g. gaseous Ni2+ or Mo0, the energy of the d-orbitals are equal in energy; that is, they are "degenerate". In an octahedral complex, this degeneracy is lifted. The energy of the dz2 and dx2−y2, the so-called eg set, which are aimed directly at the ligands are destabilized. On the other hand, the energy of the dxz, dxy, and dyz orbitals, the so-called t2g set, are stabilized. The labels t2g and eg refer to irreducible representations, which describe the symmetry properties of these orbitals. The energy gap separating these two sets is the basis of crystal field theory and the more comprehensive ligand field theory. The loss of degeneracy upon the formation of an octahedral complex from a free ion is called crystal field splitting or ligand field splitting. The energy gap is labeled Δo, which varies according to the number and nature of the ligands. If the symmetry of the complex is lower than octahedral, the eg and t2g levels can split further. For example, the t2g and eg sets split further in trans-MLL.

Ligand strength has the following order for these electron donors:
weak: iodine < bromine < fluorine < acetate < oxalate < water < pyridine < cyanide :strong

So called "weak field ligands" give rise to small Δo and absorb light at longer wavelengths.

Reactions 

Given that a virtually uncountable variety of octahedral complexes exist, it is not surprising that a wide variety of reactions have been described. These reactions can be classified as follows:

 Ligand substitution reactions (via a variety of mechanisms)
 Ligand addition reactions, including among many, protonation
 Redox reactions (where electrons are gained or lost)
 Rearrangements where the relative stereochemistry of the ligand changes within the coordination sphere.

Many reactions of octahedral transition metal complexes occur in water. When an anionic ligand replaces a coordinated water molecule the reaction is called an anation. The reverse reaction, water replacing an anionic ligand, is called aquation. For example, the  slowly yields  in water, especially in the presence of acid or base. Addition of concentrated HCl converts the aquo complex back to the chloride, via an anation process.

See also 

 Octahedral clusters
 AXE method
 Molecular geometry

References

External links 
 Example of octahedral geometry at 3dCHEM.com 
 Indiana University Molecular Structure Center
 Point Group Symmetry Examples

Molecular geometry
Coordination chemistry